American Rubicon is the second full-length album from punk rock band Cobra Skulls.  It was digitally released by Red Scare Industries on July 7, 2009, with a physical release following one week later on July 14.  It is the band's first release with guitarist Adam Beck, who joined the band in 2008 after the departure of Charlie Parker.

The band entered the studio in late March 2009 to record the album.  The album was finished and final details were announced on June 15, 2009.  The same day, the band posted a new song, titled "H.D.U.I. (Honorary Discharge Under the Influence)", on their Myspace page.  The song details frontman Devin Peralta's encounter with an Iraq War veteran who was discharged from the military for intentionally driving under the influence in the desert.

The title of the tenth track, "I Used to Like Them When They Put 'Cobra' in the Titles", is in reference to the band's previous album, Sitting Army, in which every track had the word "cobra" in the title.

Track listing

Personnel 
 Devin Peralta - vocals, bass
 Adam Beck - guitar
 Chad Cleveland - drums

References 

Cobra Skulls albums
2009 albums
Red Scare Industries albums